Matthew Saad Muhammad (born Maxwell Antonio Loach; June 16, 1954 – May 25, 2014) was an American professional boxer who was the WBC Light Heavyweight Champion of the World for two-and-a-half years.

Background
Saad Muhammad's mother died when he was an infant, and he and his elder brother were sent to live with an aunt. When he was five, his aunt could not afford to look after both of them and she instructed his brother to get rid of him. His brother took him to Philadelphia's Benjamin Franklin Parkway and then ran away. Saad was found in the early hours asleep on the steps of a church.He was then taken in by Catholic Social Services. The nuns gave him the name Matthew Franklin (after the saint and the parkway where he was found). Matthew lived in foster care until a couple from Philadelphia adopted him, raised him, and took care of him like he was their own.

Saad Muhammad was very popular in the late 1970s and early 1980s among boxing fans because of his particularly action-oriented style. Saad Muhammad was known for his ability to take punishment and mount comebacks, and because of this, he was nicknamed Miracle Matthew.

Saad Muhammad was also part of a group of world light heavyweight champions who became Muslims and changed their names during his era as a Light-Heavyweight, the others being Eddie Mustafa Muhammad (born as Eddie Gregory), and Dwight Muhammad Qawi (born as Dwight Braxton).  Saad Muhammad confirmed this in interviews following his boxing career, stating that he was inspired to convert by Muhammad Ali's conversion.

Amateur career
Saad Muhammad had a relatively short amateur career, consisting of only 20 amateur bouts.  He won the Trenton (NJ) Golden Gloves in 1973 and turned pro the following year.

Professional boxing career
Saad Muhammad began to box professionally in 1974, winning his first fight with a second-round knockout win against Billy Early. He posted seven more wins that year before suffering his first loss at the hands of Wayne McGee by a decision in six rounds.

In 1975, after two wins, he and McGee fought again, in a six-round draw. In 1976, he had two matches each with future world champions Marvin Camel and Mate Parlov.

His first fight with Parlov, in Milan, was also his first fight abroad. He beat Parlov in an eight-round decision. He then beat Camel in a ten-round decision, but lost the rematch, also in a ten-round decision. He returned to Italy for a rematch with Parlov, which resulted in a ten-round draw.

Saad Muhammad began 1977 by losing to Mustafa Muhammad (then Edward Lee Gregory), but then defeated the future three-time world champion Marvin Johnson by a knockout in round 12 for the United States Light-Heavyweight title in his first nationally televised match.

In 1978, he won all four of his bouts, including successful defenses of his title against former world title challenger Richie Kates and against four-time world title challenger Yaqui López. The Lopez fight, their first of two, was considered a classic by boxing experts, Saad Muhammad surviving a relentless attack by López to score an 11th-round knockout.

In 1979, after Johnson became world champion by defeating Parlov, he and Saad Muhammad met again on April 22 in Johnson's hometown of Indianapolis for the WBC's world light heavyweight crown . In a fight considered by many experts as a Saad Muhammad classic, and which subsequently featured on ESPN's Classic Fights show, Saad Muhammad won with an eight-round knockout after staggering Johnson towards the end of the seventh round.  Shortly afterward, he converted to Islam and changed his name to Matthew Saad Muhammad.

In his first title defense, Saad Muhammad met former world champion John Conteh in Atlantic City. He retained the world title with a 15-round decision. The decision, however, was voided and a rematch ordered because Muhammad's cornermen used an illegal substance to stop the bleeding from a cut. Muhammad retained the crown with a knockout in round four in the second bout. After defeating Louis Pergaud, he and López met again, this time, with the world title on the line. Their rematch has also been shown by ESPN's classic network several times, it was the fight of the year for 1980, according to Ring Magazine, and is still written about by boxing aficionados. Saad Muhammad was hit with 20 unanswered blows in round eight, but he recovered and dropped López five times en route to a 14th-round knockout win. “This was my toughest fight,” said Saad Muhammad of the fight, which some consider the closest López ever came to a world title.

He then went on to defeat Lottie Mwale, Vonzell Johnson, future world Super-Middleweight champion Murray Sutherland and Jerry Martin, all in defense of his world title, before losing to Dwight Muhammad Qawi in December 1981. In yet another fight that would later be shown on ESPN's classic network, Saad Muhammad lost his title when Qawi knocked him out in 10 rounds.

Saad Muhammad entered 1982 with a rematch against Qawi within his sights, and he defeated Pete McIntyre by a knockout in round two. The rematch between Saad Muhammad and Qawi came off in August, at Saad Muhammad's hometown of Philadelphia. The second time around, Qawi won by a knockout in round six.

From there on until 1992, Saad Muhammad fought sporadically and with limited success. He had been confronting vision problems, and in 1986, he declared himself in bankruptcy.

After he lost the rematch to Qawi fought in Australia, Spain, The Bahamas and Trinidad and Tobago.

MMA career
Saad Muhammad also took a turn in the forerunner of mixed martial arts in Japan, participating in the first UWF International (UWFi) event in 1991.  Matched against Kiyoshi Tamura, Saad Muhammad talked a great deal at a lead-in press conference. He declined to say in which round he would knock Tamura out, but guaranteed a victory. Tamura submitted Saad Muhammad 34 seconds into the first round.

Retirement from boxing

Saad Muhammad retired from professional boxing with a record of 39 wins, 16 losses and 3 draws, with 29 wins by knockout.

In 1998, he became a member of the International Boxing Hall of Fame.

Boxing trainer
Muhammad trained up and coming fighters out of Atlantic City, New Jersey and worked closely with former Indian Olympic boxing team heavyweight Gurcharan "The Guru" Singh.

Retirement and death
In July 2010, Saad Muhammad was homeless and living in a shelter in Philadelphia.  He later became involved in charity work in the Philadelphia area, some of which focused on raising money for the homeless.
He died at a hospital in Philadelphia on May 25, 2014; his cause of death was unknown, though he was diagnosed with amyotrophic lateral sclerosis (ALS).

Muhammad was listed as number 24 on Ring Magazine's list of 100 greatest punchers of all time.

Professional boxing record

See also
List of world light-heavyweight boxing champions

References

External links

|-

1954 births
2014 deaths
American male boxers
African-American boxers
Boxers from Philadelphia
Converts to Islam
African-American Muslims
African-American former Christians
African American adoptees
Sportspeople with a vision impairment
Deaths from motor neuron disease
Neurological disease deaths in Pennsylvania
Burials at Ivy Hill Cemetery (Philadelphia)
International Boxing Hall of Fame inductees
World light-heavyweight boxing champions
World Boxing Council champions
The Ring (magazine) champions